The National Party of Honduras (PNH) is a conservative  political party in Honduras founded on 27 February 1902, by Manuel Bonilla Chirinos. Historically it has been one of the two most influential parties in the country. The party's platform is based on Christian humanist doctrine, and its five main principles are common wealth, dignity of the human person, equality, solidarity and subsidiarity.

Since the foundation of the National Party, Honduras has had 13 PNH presidents. Manuel Bonilla was the first (1903–1907), and the most recent is the president, Juan Orlando Hernández who served from 2014 to 2022. The party was the ruling directive of the National Congress from 2009 to 2022 and currently holds the most of the country's municipalities.

History
The ideology of the party can be traced back to national hero José Trinidad Cabañas's principles and thinking. Cabañas believed in a strong sense of patriotism, and that national interest was over any other interest.
Moreover, in the late 1800s, actors such as Ponciano Leiva and Luis Bogran made efforts to conform an institution which reflected their ideology.

The Progressive Party, led by Ponciano Leiva, joined forces by a movement led by General Manuel Bonilla. On 27 February 1902, in Tegucigalpa, both parties united to form the National Convention, backed by 40,000 signatures from supporters. That event was the birth of the National Party of Honduras.

Symbols

Seal
Fraternity, equality and justice are reflected in the official seal. Holding arms represent fraternity among Honduran citizens. The scale represents equality between men and women. The burning torch shines defending those in need. The seal also states the party's motto: Social Justice with Liberty and Democracy.

Organic structure
 National Convention: Made up from Municipal, State, Regional and national authorities.
 Permanent Commission: Permanent members of the National Convention
 National Committee: Political Commission, Justice Party, Financial and Budget Administration, Political and Ideological Formation
 State Committee: Conformed by the authorities of each of the 18 departments in Honduras
 Local Committee: Counts with Municipal Representation

Electoral history

Presidential elections

National Congress elections

Controversies
The National Party has been involved in the last few years on several issues of corruption. In 2015, it was discovered that the National Party was using money from the Honduran Social Security in order to finance the campaign of President Juan Orlando Hernandez through an elaborate scheme of companies redirecting Social Security funds to the party. After the scheme was discovered, the President said the money should be returned by the party.

Former President Porfirio Lobo was accused in March 2017 by the New York's DA office for helping protect drug organizations.

In April 2022, former president of Honduras, Juan Orlando Hernández, who served two terms between 2014 and January 2022, was extradited to the United States to face charges of drug trafficking and money laundering. Hernandez denied the accusations.

See also
 List of conservative parties by country

References

External links

1918 establishments in Honduras
Conservative parties in North America
Nationalist parties in North America
International Democrat Union member parties
Political parties established in 1918
Political parties in Honduras
Right-wing parties in North America
National conservative parties
Conservatism in Honduras